The Lightfoot Professor of Divinity is a professorship or chair in the Department of Theology and Religion at Durham University. The chair is named after the former Bishop of Durham J. B. Lightfoot. The current holder is John M. G. Barclay.

Lightfoot Professor of Divinity
 Stanley Lawrence Greenslade (1943–1950)
 Hugh Turner (1950–1958)
 Christopher Evans (1959–1962)
 R. P. C. Hanson (1962–1964)
 Douglas Rawlinson Jones, Old Testament (1964–1985)
 James D. G. Dunn, New Testament (1990–2003)
 John M. G. Barclay, New Testament (2003–present)

See also
 Bede Professor of Catholic Theology
 Van Mildert Professor of Divinity

References

Divinity, Lightfoot
Divinity, Lightfoot